Deh-e Reza (also Romanized as Deh-e Reẕā; also known as Mowtowr-e Reẕā) is a village in Ladiz Rural District, in the Central District of Mirjaveh County, Sistan and Baluchestan Province, Iran. At the 2006 census, its population was 41, in 10 families.

References 

Populated places in Mirjaveh County